Gabriele Günz, née Niebling (born 8 September 1961 in Eisenach) is a retired East German high jumper.

Biography
She won the silver medal at the 1986 European Indoor Championships. and finished sixth at the 1988 European Indoor Championships. She represented the sports club SC DHfK Leipzig, and became East German champion in 1988.

Her personal best jump was 1.97 metres, achieved in June 1987 in Halle. She had 2.01 metres on the indoor track, from January 1988 in Stuttgart.

See also
Female two metres club

References

External links

1961 births
Living people
East German female high jumpers
SC DHfK Leipzig athletes
People from Eisenach
Sportspeople from Thuringia